Chitãozinho & Xororó are a Brazilian sertanejo duo. Chitãozinho is the stage name of José Lima Sobrinho and Xororó of Durval de Lima. Their music, which combines traditional Brazilian caipira with pop, was instrumental in establishing the sertanejo genre. They have sold over 40 million albums since their first album was released in 1969.

Chitãozinho & Xororó are brothers, and were trained in music by their father, a vocalist and composer. They first performed publicly under the name Irmãos Lima, playing at festas juninas in Brazil. Their debut television appearance came in 1967 on Silvio Santos's show, and in 1969 they played on Cidade Sertaneja. Their first album was released in 1970, and the following year they appeared in the film No Rancho Fundo. Their fame and album sales steadily increased over the 1970s; in 1982, their Somos Apaixonados sold over a million copies. Their first TV special for SBT, featuring Roberto Carlos, came in 1986; in 1988, their performance at the Palace marked the widespread acceptance of sertanejo music among the urban middle and upper classes.

The duo continued to win international recognition, performing in Las Vegas in 1989 and in 1993 in Miami with The Bee Gees. Their first Spanish language album appeared in 1991. They founded a children's charity in their name in 1992. In 1993, they recorded the theme song for Guadalupe which peaked at number-one on the Hot Latin Songs chart. In 1994, Chitãozinho & Xororó recorded two songs, "Ela Não Vai Mais Chorar" and "Pura Emoção", with Billy Ray Cyrus, and in 1999 they sang "Coração Vazio" with Reba McEntire.

Their Spanish-language recordings are credited to José y Durval.

In 2021, their album Tempo de Romance won the Latin Grammy Award for Best Sertaneja Music Album.

Discography
Galopeira (1970)
A Mais Jovem Dupla Sertaneja (1972)
Caminhos de Minha Infância (1974)
Doce Amada (1975)
A Força Jovem da Música Sertaneja (1977)
60 Dias Apaixonado (1979)
Amante Amada (1981)
Somos Apaixonados (1982)
Amante (1984)
Fotografia (1985)
Coração Quebrado (1986)
Meu Disfarce (1987)
Os Meninos do Brasil (1989)
Nossas Canções Preferidas (1989)
Cowboy do Asfalto (1990)
Planeta Azul (1991)
Ao Vivo (1992) (live)
Tudo por Amor (1993)
Coração do Brasil (1994)
Chitãozinho e Xororó (1995)
Clássicos Sertanejos (1996)
Em Família (1997)
Na Aba do Meu Chapéu (1998)
Alô (1999)
Irmãos Coragem (2000)
Inseparáveis (2001)
Festa do Interior (2002) – Grammy Award nominee
Aqui o Sistema é Bruto (2004) – Grammy Award nominee
Vida Marvada (2006) – Grammy Award winner
Grandes Clássicos Sertanejos I Acústico (2007) – Grammy Award winner
Grandes Clássicos Sertanejos II Acústico (2007)  – Grammy Award winner
Se For Pra Ser Feliz – Grammy Award nominee 
 40 Anos – Nova Geração (2010)
 40 Anos – Entre Amigos (2010)
 40 Anos – Sinfônico (2011) – Grammy Award winner
 Do Tamanho do Nosso Amor (2013) – Latin Grammy Award for Best Sertaneja Music Album nominee

References

External links
Official website

Musical groups established in 1967
Brazilian musical duos
Sertanejo music groups
Sertanejo musicians
Sibling musical duos
1967 establishments in Brazil
Latin Grammy Award winners
Spanish-language singers of Brazil